Raja Issa El-Issa (1922 – December 1, 2008) was a Palestinian journalist.

Early life 
El-Issa was born in Jaffa to the prominent Palestinian Christian El-Issa family. The family is known for its 'intellect, politics and literature'. Eleven years before his birth, his father Issa El-Issa founded the pioneering Falastin newspaper.

Career 
El-Issa took the managers position of the newspaper after his father's death, and later became the first chairman of the Jordan Press Association in Amman, Jordan, 1956. The slogan El-Issa advocated in the press sector for nearly a quarter of a century was the saying of Mustafa Kemal: "Freedom is not dear to a people who work to obtain it. They strive to achieve it... the rock melts and crumbles as the water falls on it drop by drop."

On Falastin,

The newspaper continued to be published in East Jerusalem until 1967 when it was merged with Al-Manar to produce the Jordanian-based Ad-Dustuor newspaper based in Amman, which is still published today. El-Issa wrote an influential opening editorial for the paper in 1967 titled “Between Me and Her, Companionship and Life.” It reflects on his childhood dreams, the emotions of a bully and youthful determination. As El-Issa said,

On the attempted assassination of his editor-in-chief by rebel elements,

Personal life 
El-Issa was married to Nadia, a Syro-Lebanese woman. He died on 1 December 2008 at the age of 86 in Amman.

References 

1922 births
2008 deaths
Eastern Orthodox Christians from Palestine
Palestinian journalists
Palestinian newspaper publishers (people)
People from Jaffa
20th-century journalists
Palestinians
Palestinian nationalists